Ephraim Franklin Morgan (January 16, 1869January 15, 1950) was an American Republican politician who served as the Governor of West Virginia from 1921 to 1925. He was born on a farm near Forksburg, Marion County, West Virginia, a descendant of the first white settler of western Virginia, Morgan Morgan, and his son David Morgan. He studied at Fairmont State Normal School and graduated from the West Virginia University law school in 1897. After establishing a law practice in Fairmont, Morgan enlisted in the First West Virginia Infantry during the Spanish–American War. Following the war, he became the Fairmont city attorney. He served as a judge of the Marion County Intermediate Court from 1907 to 1912 and as a member of the West Virginia Public Service Commission from 1915 to 1920. In 1902, he married Alma Bennett.

At the time Morgan became governor, a virtual state of war existed between union coal miners and coal operators. The United Mine Workers union was protesting for the right to organize miners in the southwestern part of the state. In late summer 1921, the governor called upon President Warren G. Harding to dispatch federal troops to end an armed miners' march in Boone and Logan counties. After the conflict ended, Morgan used National Guard troops to discourage miners from again taking up arms. A more detailed discussion of the 1921 armed miners' march and the Battle of Blair Mountain can be found in Clayton D. Laurie's "The United States Army and the Return to Normalcy in Labor Dispute Interventions: The Case of the West Virginia Coal Mine Wars, 1920–1921" in West Virginia History, Volume 50 (1991).

Under Morgan, the legislature created a sinking fund to provide financial assistance to new programs, namely a new road system. He appointed a Capitol Commission to devise a plan for replacing the old state capitol, which was destroyed by fire on January 3, 1921. The west wing of the present state capitol was completed in 1925. One week before leaving office, Ephraim and Alma Morgan became the first residents of the present West Virginia Governor's Mansion.

After his term as governor, Morgan served as solicitor for the United States Department of Commerce before retiring in Fairmont, West Virginia. In 1940, he was defeated for the Republican nomination for the United States Senate. He died in Bethesda, Maryland, on January 15, 1950, one day before his 81st birthday.

References

External links
The West Virginia & Regional History Center at West Virginia University houses the papers of Ephraim F. Morgan in two collections, A&M 203 and A&M 1660
 Biography of Ephraim F. Morgan
 Inaugural Address of Ephraim F. Morgan

1869 births
1950 deaths
Methodists from West Virginia
Military personnel from West Virginia
American military personnel of the Spanish–American War
American people of Welsh descent
Fairmont State University alumni
Republican Party governors of West Virginia
Morgan family of West Virginia
People from Marion County, West Virginia
United States Department of Commerce officials
West Virginia lawyers
West Virginia county court judges
West Virginia University College of Law alumni
West Virginia city attorneys
20th-century American politicians
Lawyers from Fairmont, West Virginia
Politicians from Fairmont, West Virginia